Lambeth, Ontario may refer to:

Lambeth, Middlesex County, Ontario, a neighbourhood in the City of London, Ontario, Canada
Lambeth, Oxford County, Ontario, a municipality in Canada